Laure Calamy (born March 22, 1975) is a César Award-winning French film, TV and theatre actress best known for her roles in Call My Agent! and My Donkey, My Lover & I.

Early life
Born in 1975, Calamy is the daughter of a psychologist and a doctor. She first tried her hand at theatre during her youth.

In 2000, after completing the baccalaureate, Calamy moved to Paris to study at the Conservatoire de Paris, from which she graduated in 2001. At the Conservatoire, she met Olivier Py, who directed her in Au monde comme pas y être, Orlando ou l'impatience and Les Parisiens.

Career 
Critics lauded Calamy's performances in the short films Ce qu'il restera de nous, directed by Vincent Macaigne, and Un monde sans femmes, directed by Guillaume Brac, for which she received the Jeanine Bazin prize at the Festival Entrevues de Belfort.

Her performance in Cécile Ducrocq's short film Back Alley (La contre-allée), which was first screened during International Critics' Week at the Cannes Film Festival, earned her a Special Jury Prize for Acting at the Sundance Film Festival.

Calamy initially appeared in feature films in supporting roles. She became known to a wider audience for her portrayal of Noémie in the television series Call My Agent! (Dix pour cent).

In 2018, she was nominated for the César Award for Best Supporting Actress for her role in Léa Mysius's Ava. The same year, she received the Molière Award for Best Actress in a Private Theatre Show for her performance in Marivaux's The Game of Love and Chance (Le jeu de l'amour et du hasard), directed by Catherine Hiegel at the Théâtre de la Porte-Saint-Martin.

On December 19, 2018, more than 70 celebrities, including Calamy, responded to a call to action by the organisation Urgence Homophobie to combat anti-LGBT bullying. She appears in the music video for the song "De l'amour".

She is a member of the 50/50 Collective, which aims to promote equality between women and men in the cinema and audiovisual sector.

In 2020, Calamy starred as Antoinette in Caroline Vignal's My Donkey, My Lover & I (Antoinette dans les Cevennes), an unexpected box-office success in France, and received positive reviews from critics. She won the César Award for Best Actress for her role in the film.

In 2021 Calamy won the Orizzonti Award for Best Actress at the 78th Venice International Film Festival for her starring role in Éric Gravel's Full Time.

Theatre

Filmography

References

External links

French film actresses
21st-century French actresses
Living people
1975 births

Best Actress César Award winners